David Jones (born October 11, 1940) is a sailor from United States Virgin Islands. Jones represented his country at the 1972 Summer Olympics in Kiel. Jones took 24th place in the Soling with Dick Holmberg as helmsman and David Kelly as fellow crew member.

References

External links
 
 
 

1940 births
Living people
Olympic sailors of the United States Virgin Islands
United States Virgin Islands male sailors (sport)
Sailors at the 1972 Summer Olympics – Soling